Giuseppe Cuomo (born 2 February 1998) is an Italian footballer who plays for Serie B side Crotone, as a defender.

Career
Cuomo made his professional debut for Crotone in a Serie A 3–0 loss to Napoli on 12 March 2017.

References

External links
 Giuseppe Cuomo at F.C. Crotone 
 

Living people
1998 births
Sportspeople from the Province of Naples
Association football defenders
Italian footballers
F.C. Crotone players
Serie A players
Serie B players
Serie C players
Footballers from Campania